Finaghy railway station is located in the townland of Finaghy (aka Ballyfinaghy) in south Belfast, County Antrim, Northern Ireland. The Great Northern Railway of Ireland opened the station on 9 February 1907.

Service

Extra services operate at peak times, and the service reduces to hourly operation in the evenings.

On Sundays there is an hourly service in each direction.

References

External links

Railway stations in Belfast
Railway stations opened in 1907
Railway stations served by NI Railways
Railway stations in Northern Ireland opened in the 20th century